Ramakrishnan Ramkumar (born 27 March 1980) is a first-class cricketer who played for Tamil Nadu in the Ranji Trophy. He was born in Cuddalore, Tamil Nadu, India.

Ramkumar is a left-hand batsman and left-arm orthodox bowler. He took a hat-trick in the 2003-04 Ranji Trophy playing for Tamil Nadu against Karnataka.

Teams
Ranji Trophy: Tamil Nadu

See also
 List of hat-tricks in the Ranji Trophy

References

Indian cricketers
1980 births
Tamil Nadu cricketers
Living people